Schistophleps mundata is a moth in the subfamily Arctiinae. It was described by Reich in 1957. It is found in China.

References

Natural History Museum Lepidoptera generic names catalog

Moths described in 1957
Nudariina